Leo Ryan Pinder (born 13 September 1974) is a Bahamian lawyer and Progressive Liberal Party politician who has served in the Bahamas Senate and as Attorney-General and Minister of Legal Affairs since September 2021. He was previously a Member of Parliament (MP) for Elizabeth from 2010 to 2017.

Early life
Pinder was born at the Rassin Hospital (now Doctor's Hospital) in Downtown Nassau to Marvin and Nancy Pinder. His paternal family has been in the Bahamas over 300 years, and his father was an MP in the Pindling government.

Pinder attended Queen's College and St Andrew's School locally before going to the Stony Brook School in New York for high school. He studied at the University of Miami, graduating with a Bachelor and Master of Business Administration from the business school and then a JD and Master of Laws from the law school.

Pinder was called to the Florida Bar in 2000 and practiced law in the United States for a number of years before returning to Nassau where he took a six-month course at the Eugene Dupuch Law School. A U.S. citizen by descent through his mother, he renounced U.S. citizenship in February 2010.

Career
In 2009, Pinder was elected vice-chairman of the Progressive Liberal Party and co-chairman of the party's Committee of Foreign Affairs. The following year, he won a parliamentary by-election for the Elizabeth constituency triggered by Malcolm Adderley's resignation. At the time of his election, Pinder was the youngest PLP MP and one of only two MPs born after independence. He sat on the Committee of Public Accounts.

After being reelected in the 2012 general election, Pinder served as the Minister of Financial Services until his resignation in December 2014. He was succeeded by Hope Strachan. Following that, he spent a year with Deltec, a private bank, and then in 2015 joined the law firm of Graham, Thompson & Co as a partner. He stood down at the 2017 general election.

When the PLP defeated the FNM in September 2021, Pinder was appointed Senator by Prime Minister Philip Davis and to the Office of the Attorney-General and Ministry of Legal Affairs.

Personal
Pinder is married to Ellissa McCombe.  Pinder has two children.

References

Living people
Attorneys General of the Bahamas
Bahamian people of American descent
Bahamian lawyers
Barristers and advocates
Former United States citizens
Government ministers of the Bahamas
Members of the House of Assembly of the Bahamas
Members of the Senate of the Bahamas
People from Nassau, Bahamas
Progressive Liberal Party politicians
University of Miami Business School alumni
University of Miami School of Law alumni
1973 births